Arthur Lee Whittington (born September 4, 1955) is a former American football running back. He played for five seasons for the Oakland Raiders and the Buffalo Bills, and from 1983 to 1985 with the Oakland Invaders of the USFL.

Career
As a rookie in 1978, Whittington proved to be a valuable weapon in the Raiders backfield. He finished the year with 661 yards rushing and seven scores while recording 23 catches for 106 yards over nine starts. The next season, he started just seven games but ran for 397 yards and two touchdowns while recording 19 catches for 240 yards. By 1980, Whittington had developed a complementary role, running for just 299 yards and 3 TD in two starts but had 19 catches for 205 yards.  His final year with Oakland, 1981, saw him start 2 games and run for 220 yards and one touchdown while recording 23 catches for 213 yards and 2 TD.

Along with being a serviceable running back, Whittington proved to be an adept kick returner. In 1978, he averaged 20.6 yards on 23 kick returns.  In 1980, he averaged 18.7 yards on 21 returns including 1 TD.  In 1981, he averaged 22.5 yards on 25 returns.

Whittington has five children. His two daughters Amber and Ashton are both YouTube personalities.

References

1955 births
Living people
People from Cuero, Texas
Players of American football from Texas
American football running backs
SMU Mustangs football players
Oakland Raiders players
Buffalo Bills players
Oakland Invaders players